The Bakken is a science museum located in Minneapolis, Minnesota, United States, founded in 1975 by Earl Bakken, the co-founder of Medtronic. The exhibits present a history and explanation of electricity and electromagnetism.

Exhibits
Approximately 11,000 written works, and about 2,000 scientific instruments are stored at the museum. Some specifically for electrophysiology and electrotherapeutics. Significant holdings include works by Jean Antoine Nollet, Benjamin Franklin, Giovanni Battista Beccaria, Luigi Galvani, Giovanni Aldini, Alessandro Volta, Guillame Benjamin Amand Duchenne, and Emil Heinrich Du Bois-Reymond and the journals Annalen der Physik, the Philosophical Transactions and Proceedings of the Royal Society and Zeitschrift für Physik.

Permanent exhibits include the following:

 Frankenstein’s Laboratory is an immersive object theater featuring Frankenstein’s monster.
 Deep Roots: Plants as Medicine discusses modern preconceptions about the relationship between plants and wellness.
 Ben Franklin’s Electricity Party allows visitors to try out electric party tricks similar to those conducted by Ben Franklin and other scientists during electricity parties in the 1700s.
 Mary and Her Monster See Mary Shelley’s magic bookcase filled with artifacts and books from The Bakken collection, solve the puzzle of Frankenstein’s story illustrated by artist Zak Sally, and meet a living portrait of Mary that allows visitors to hear about the people, science, art and culture that inspired her.

The Florence Bakken Medicinal Garden and a statue of Hermes or Mercury, the messenger god of Ancient Greece and Rome, are focal points of the grounds. A newspaper reporter once said the venue, "seems a throwback to another time when skilled craftsmen shaped stone, wood and glass into places with lasting appeal".

History

The Bakken was founded by inventor Earl Bakken who founded the medical technology company Medtronic in 1949. 

At Bakken's suggestion in 1969, Dennis Stillings, who at the time worked for Medtronic in its library, began to acquire books and devices. By 1974, the collection was well known among antiquarians and was offered two lots of early electrical devices. At first stored at the Medtronic headquarters in Saint Anthony Village, Minnesota, the collection by 1975 occupied a floor in the Medtronic branch office in Brooklyn Center, Minnesota and in 1976 began to be moved to its present location.

Formerly funded by the museum, the Bakken Quartet performed chamber music on the premises. Today, the group is named the Bakken Trio and performs in Saint Paul, Minnesota.

Facility

Architect Carl A. Gage originally constructed the building between 1928 and 1930 as the home of William Goodfellow, who sold his dry goods store in 1904 to George Dayton, founder of today's Target Corporation. A combination of 16th-century English styles including Tudor and Gothic Revival, the home was named "West Winds" and contains "dark wood interior paneling, open-beamed ceilings, grouped and arched windows and stained glass". The original home had fifteen rooms and eleven bathrooms. When he died in 1944, Goodfellow donated the buildings to the Girl Scouts. The family of Richard Cornelius lived there between 1953 and 1976, after which the house became the Bakken Museum.

Gallery

References

External links

1975 establishments in Minnesota
Museums established in 1975
Museums in Minneapolis
Science museums in Minnesota
Medical museums in the United States
Medtronic
Futures studies organizations